Epiblema costipunctana is a species of moth belonging to the family Tortricidae. It is native to Europe.

The wingspan is 13-18mm.The forewings are fuscous, sometimes ochreous- tinged, irregularly marked with black.The costa is strigulated with black and white .Three streaks from costa and the margins of ocellus are leaden - metallic. The sharply angulated edge of basal patch and the central fascia are darker and separated by a somewhat pentagonal white dorsal blotch more or less strigulated with blackish. There is a suffused blackish spot before apex. The hindwings are fuscous, in male basally whitish, with terminal and broader dorsal blackish fascia, in female posteriorly darker fuscous. The larva is pinkish-white, sharply ringed with white ; spots red ; head brown ; plate of 2 whitish or grey, posterior edge blackish.

The moths fly from  May to July and again from late July to September.
The larvae feed on Senecio jacobaea.

References

External links
lepiforum.de

Eucosmini
Moths described in 1811